Pistol Bay is a waterway in Kivalliq Region, Nunavut, Canada. It is located in northwestern Hudson Bay between Igloo Point and Term Point. The Pork Peninsula separates the bay and Corbett Inlet.

History
In 1815, Robert Kerr wrote that it was considered at one point as a possible gateway to the Northwest Passage.

References

Bays of Kivalliq Region